Venturin Thrauison was a politician of the late 16th century in Slovenia when the country was under the Holy Roman Empire. He became mayor of Ljubljana in 1593.
He was succeeded by Mihael Rosen in 1595.

References

Mayors of places in the Holy Roman Empire
Mayors of Ljubljana
Year of birth missing
Year of death missing
16th-century Slovenian people